Alain Brangi is a French curler.

Teams

References

External links

 Brangi Immobilier : Your real estate agency in Megève | Brangi Immobilier - Agence Immobilière Megève
 Monsieur Alain Brangi (Megeve) - Societe.com
 Monsieur Alain Brangi (Megeve, 74120) : siret, TVA, adresse...

Living people
French male curlers

Year of birth missing (living people)
Place of birth missing (living people)